Kingman is an unorganized territory (township) in Penobscot County, Maine, United States. The population was 137 at the 2020 census.

Geography
According to the United States Census Bureau, the unorganized territory has a total area of 25.4 square miles (65.7 km2), of which 25.0 square miles (64.7 km2) is land and 0.4 square miles (0.9 km2), or 1.42%, is water.

Historic Building

The Romanzo Kingman House (1872) is on the National Register of Historic Places.

Demographics

At the 2000 census there were 213 people, 91 households, and 66 families living in the unorganized territory.  The population density was 8.5 people per square mile (3.3/km2).  There were 114 housing units at an average density of 4.6/sq mi (1.8/km2).  The racial makeup of the unorganized territory was 100.00% White.
Of the 91 households 23.1% had children under the age of 18 living with them, 64.8% were married couples living together, 6.6% had a female householder with no husband present, and 26.4% were non-families. 22.0% of households were one person and 11.0% were one person aged 65 or older.  The average household size was 2.34 and the average family size was 2.66.

The age distribution was 16.9% under the age of 18, 4.7% from 18 to 24, 28.6% from 25 to 44, 30.0% from 45 to 64, and 19.7% 65 or older.  The median age was 45 years. For every 100 females, there were 85.2 males.  For every 100 females age 18 and over, there were 86.3 males.

The median household income was $21,875 and the median family income  was $28,611. Males had a median income of $28,750 versus $22,500 for females. The per capita income for the unorganized territory was $11,490.  About 10.3% of families and 16.5% of the population were below the poverty line, including 24.1% of those under the age of 18 and 20.5% of those 65 or over.

References

Unorganized territories in Maine
Populated places in Penobscot County, Maine